aka Torasan Whistling is a 1983 Japanese comedy film directed by Yoji Yamada. It stars Kiyoshi Atsumi as Torajirō Kuruma (Tora-san), and Keiko Takeshita as his love interest or "Madonna". Tora-san Goes Religious? is the thirty-second entry in the popular, long-running Otoko wa Tsurai yo series.

Synopsis
When his travels bring him to Western Japan, Tora-san decides to pay his respects to the late Hyoichiro Suwa, his sister's father-in-law. He gets drunk with the priest at the temple, falling in love with the priest's daughter in the process. When the priest is too hung-over to deliver a eulogy the next morning, Tora-san takes his place, with great success. Tora-san's sister and his brother-in-law's family show up for Hyoichiro Suwa's memorial service, and an argument breaks out over his estate.

Cast
 Kiyoshi Atsumi as Torajirō
 Chieko Baisho as Sakura
 Keiko Takeshita as Tomoko
 Kiichi Nakai as Kazumichi
 Kaoru Sugita as Hiromi
 Shimojo Masami as Kuruma Tatsuzō
 Chieko Misaki as Tsune Kuruma (Torajiro's aunt)
 Gin Maeda as Hiroshi Suwa
 Hidetaka Yoshioka as Mitsuo Suwa
 Yoko Nada as Eriko
 Isamu Nagato as Osakaya
 Hisao Dazai as Boss (Umetarō Katsura)
 Gajirō Satō as Genkō
 Chishū Ryū as Gozen-sama
 Tatsuo Matsumura as Oshō

Critical appraisal
Tora-san Goes Religious? was the fifth highest earning film at Japanese box-offices in 1984. Stuart Galbraith IV ranks the film as one of the best in the series, noting that the "performances are excellent all-around". Galbraith observes that the film's storyline was probably inspired by the recent death of the great film actor Takashi Shimura who had played the role of the deceased Hyoichiro Suwa in three previous Otoko wa Tsurai yo films. The German-language site molodezhnaja gives Tora-san Goes Religious? four out of five stars.

Availability
Tora-san Goes Religious? had was released in theaters on December 28, 1983.

In Japan, the film was released on videotape in 1987 and 1986, and in DVD format in 1998 and 2008.

References

Bibliography

English

German

Japanese

External links
 Tora-san Goes Religious? at www.tora-san.jp (official site)
 Trailer with English subtitles

1983 films
Films directed by Yoji Yamada
1983 comedy films
1980s Japanese-language films
Otoko wa Tsurai yo films
Japanese sequel films
Shochiku films
Films with screenplays by Yôji Yamada
1980s Japanese films